Anthonomus santacruzi is a weevil that is a promising biocontrol agent for Solanum mauritianum Scopoli, which is a major ecological weed in high-rainfall regions of South Africa.

The weevil exhibited a preference for S. mauritianum and possibly two South African native species of Solanum, namely S. linnaeanum and S. tomentosum.

References

External links 
Anthonomus santacruzi

Curculioninae
Insects of South Africa